Sir David Gibbons, KBE (15 June 1927 – 30 March 2014) was a Bermudian politician and businessman. He served as Finance Minister and later as Premier for the United Bermuda Party. He had also served as a member of the Parliament of Bermuda.

Gibbons attended The Hotchkiss School and studied economics at Harvard University. As Premier he dealt with the riots in 1977 after the hanging of two men convicted of the assassination of Governor Richard Sharples, and a general strike in 1981.

He was an opponent of Bermudian independence from the United Kingdom. Both before and after his term in office Gibbons was a businessman. He ran the family business with his brother Graham.

He died after a short illness on 30 March 2014, aged 87.

References

1926 births
2014 deaths
Premiers of Bermuda
Finance Ministers of Bermuda
Ministers of Health of Bermuda
Knights Commander of the Order of the British Empire
Members of the Parliament of Bermuda
United Bermuda Party politicians
Hotchkiss School alumni
Harvard University alumni